Dodson's bulbul (Pycnonotus dodsoni) is a member of the bulbul family of passerine birds. It is found in eastern Africa.

Taxonomy and systematics
Some authorities treat the Dodson's bulbul as a subspecies of the common bulbul and formerly it has also been considered as a subspecies of the dark-capped bulbul. Alternate names include the Somali geelgat and African white-eared bulbul as well a name already in use by another species (white-eared bulbul).

Distribution and habitat
Dodson's bulbul is found from northern Somalia and south-eastern Ethiopia to east-central Kenya.

References

Dodson's bulbul
Birds of the Horn of Africa
Dodson's bulbul